The generally tolerant official drug policy in the Third Reich, the period of Nazi control of Germany from the 1933 Machtergreifung to Germany's 1945 defeat in World War II, was inherited from the Weimar government which was installed in 1919 following the dissolution of the German monarchy at the end of World War I.

Historical background
Before the First World War, the collaborative research efforts of the German university system and German corporations enabled the German corporate sector as a whole to obtain a virtual worldwide monopoly on drugs whose production required chemical expertise and industrial capacity.  This research was fueled by revenues from the sale of morphine, an alkaloid found in opium, first identified by a German chemist in the early 19th century and patented by Merck soon afterward.  German pharmaceutical companies' work with morphine and its derivatives found particular success in using them as pain relievers and cough suppressants, with Bayer eventually recognizing the potency of heroin, which was legal in Germany at the time (and until the 1950s, before which it was banned only in Asia and the United States).  During the era of the German Empire, consolidated in the late 1860s and early 1870s, the German government's militaristic inclinations prompted it to add financial support to research in sectors including pharmaceuticals and optimization of industrial processes.

The unprecedented casualties of World War I brought the need for treatment of acute and chronic pain, the means of treating that pain, and the side effects of that treatment, including opioid dependence, to the forefront of public consciousness.

Civilian-sector drug policy in Nazi Germany

The German populace's experience during and after the First World War inspired the Weimar and Nazi governments to adopt an attitude of tolerance toward the use of drugs to relieve pain, increase performance, and avoid withdrawal.  Most drugs were permitted either universally or for individuals with a medical prescription.  Many of the drug addicts in 1920s and 1930s Germany were First World War veterans who required addictive drugs for pain relief and/or medical personnel who had access to such drugs.  During the Weimar era, addiction was seen as a curable disease.  Following the advent of Nazism, addiction continued to be viewed as curable for all. Among members of such groups, symptoms of drug addiction were often attributed to other conditions, which themselves were often pseudoscientifically diagnosed; even when addiction was recognized as such, Nazi physicians often viewed it as incurable in light of what they believed to be an inherent predisposition or weakness

Drug policy and use within the Wehrmacht

Drug use in the German military during World War II was actively encouraged and widespread, especially during the war's later stages as the Wehrmacht became depleted and increasingly dependent on youth as opposed to experience.

Stimulants

In an effort to make its front-line soldiers and fighter pilots fight longer, harder, and with less concern for individual safety, the German army ordered them to take military-issue pills made from methamphetamine and a primarily cocaine-based stimulant.  After Pervitin, a methamphetamine drug newly developed by the Berlin-based Temmler pharmaceutical company, first entered the civilian market in 1938, it quickly became a top seller among the German population.  The drug was brought to the attention of Otto Friedrich Ranke, a military doctor and director of the Institute for General and Defense Physiology at Berlin's Academy of Military Medicine.  The effects of amphetamines are similar to those of the adrenaline produced by the body, triggering a heightened state of alertness. In most people, the substance increases self-confidence, concentration, and willingness to take risks while at the same time reducing sensitivity to pain, hunger, and the need for sleep.  In September 1939, Ranke tested the drug on 90 university students and concluded that Pervitin could help the Wehrmacht win the war.  

Methamphetamine use is believed to have played a role in the speed of Germany's initial blitzkrieg.

Cocaine, whose effects substantially overlap with those of amphetamine but feature greater euphoria, was later added to the formulation to increase its potency through the multiplicative effects of drug interaction and to reinforce its use by individuals.

Alcohol

At the start of World War II, alcohol consumption was widespread among members of the Wehrmacht.  At first, high-ranking officials encouraged its use as a means of relaxation and a crude method of mitigating the psychological effects of combat, in the latter case through what later scientific developments would describe as blocking the consolidation of traumatic memories.  After the Fall of France, however, Wehrmacht commanders observed that their soldiers' behavior was deteriorating, with "fights, accidents, mistreatment of subordinates, violence against superior officers and 'crimes involving unnatural sexual acts'" becoming more frequent.  The Commander-in-Chief of the German military, General Walther von Brauchitsch, concluded that his troops were committing "most serious infractions" of morality and discipline, and that the culprit was alcohol abuse.  In response, Hitler attempted to curb the reckless use of alcohol in the military, promising severe punishment for soldiers who exhibited public drunkenness or otherwise "allow[ed] themselves to be tempted to engage in criminal acts as a result of alcohol abuse."  Serious offenders could expect "a humiliating death."  This revised policy accompanied an increase in Nazi Party disapproval of alcohol use in the civilian sector, reflecting an extension to alcohol of the longstanding Nazi condemnation of tobacco consumption as diminishing the strength and purity of the "Aryan race."

Drug use inside the Nazi Party 

Adolf Hitler, the Third Reich's head of state and government until his suicide shortly before the war's end, is believed to have been addicted to drugs that were initially prescribed to treat his chronic medical conditions.  After Doctor Theodor Morell prescribed cultures of live bacteria, Hitler's digestive ailments eased, and Hitler made him his primary physician.  Dr Morell's popularity skyrocketed, and he was sarcastically dubbed by Göring "The Reichsmaster of the Injections."  Dr. Morell went on to prescribe powder cocaine to soothe Hitler's throat and clear his sinuses. 

According to Norman Ohler in his 2016 book Blitzed: Drugs in Nazi Germany, when Hitler's drug supplies ran out by the end of the war, he suffered severe withdrawal from serotonin and dopamine, paranoia, psychosis, rotting teeth, extreme shaking, kidney failure and delusion.

Hermann Göring, Hitler's closest aide, had served in the Luftstreitkräfte during World War I and suffered a severe hip injury during combat.  He became seriously addicted to the morphine that was prescribed to him in order to relieve the pain which resulted from this injury and the gunshot wound, variously described as a thigh or groin injury, that he sustained while taking part in the 1923 Beer Hall Putsch in Munich.  In 1925, after consulting his wife, he entered a Swedish mental hospital for detoxification and treatment.  When Göring was captured near the end of the war, he was found to be addicted to dihydrocodeine and was subsequently weaned off it.

Aftermath

After the war, Pervitin remained easily accessible, both on the black market and as a prescription drug. Doctors prescribed it to patients as an appetite suppressant or they prescribed it in order to improve the moods of patients who were struggling with depression. Students, especially medical students, turned to the stimulant because it enabled them to review more information through the night and finish their studies faster.  The drug was removed from the medical supplies of East and West Germany in the 1970s and 1980s respectively, and following German reunification it was deemed illegal in the entire country.  Today, a different form of the drug, crystal methamphetamine, has become popular throughout Europe and the United States despite governmental prohibition and eradication efforts.

See also
 Anti-tobacco movement in Nazi Germany
 Use of drugs in warfare

Notes

References

Further reading 
 Ohler, Norman. Blitzed: Drugs in Nazi Germany (2016), 
The pharmaceutical industry and the German National Socialist Regime: I.G. Farben and pharmacological research

Politics of Nazi Germany
Drug policy of Germany
Psychoactive drugs and the military